Mukim Peramu is a mukim in Brunei-Muara District, Brunei. It is located within Kampong Ayer, the historical stilt settlements on the Brunei River in the capital Bandar Seri Begawan. The population was 1,111 in 2016.

Name 
The mukim is named after Kampong Peramu, one of the villages it encompasses.

Geography 
The mukim borders Mukim Kianggeh to the north, Mukim Saba to the east, Mukim Sungai Kebun to the south and Mukim Burong Pingai Ayer to the west.

Demographics 
As of 2016 census, the population 1,111 with  males and  females. The mukim had 169 households occupying 169 dwellings. The entire population lived in urban areas.

Villages 
As of 2016, Mukim Peramu comprised the following census villages:

Facilities 
Pengiran Anak Puteri Besar Primary School is the sole primary school.

The  of Kampong Peramu is the sole mosque and serves the Muslim residents for congregational Islamic prayers and activities.

References 

Peramu
Brunei-Muara District